Bernadette Castro (born July 10, 1944 in Manhattan) is an American businesswoman and former New York politician who served in the Cabinet of former New York Governor George Pataki. She is a partner with her family in Castro Properties.

In the early 1960s, she pursued a singing career with mild success. Castro recorded several singles, the 1964 "His Lips Get in the Way" among others.
 
After earning her master's degree at the University of Florida, Bernadette worked in the advertising and promotions department of Castro Convertibles. While raising her four children, Bernadette worked in the business on a limited basis and later moved into her role as the company CEO when they were grown. In 2009 Bernadette bought back the Castro Convertibles furniture business with her family.

Early life and education
Bernadette became involved with the Castro Convertibles business at a very early age. As a 4-year-old child, Castro starred in the brand's iconic television commercials that ran over 40,000 times, earning her the distinction of being the most televised child in America.  With these commercials, and subsequent parodies of the commercials on shows such as The Tonight Show Starring Johnny Carson, The Jackie Gleason Show, and Milton Berle's Texaco Star Theatre, Bernadette catapulted her father Bernard's innovative convertible couch to national fame by illustrating how the convertibles were "So easy to open, even a child can do it!" At the age of twelve, Bernadette starred in the first live, color television commercial.

Bernadette graduated from the University of Florida with a Bachelors of Science in 1966 in Broadcast Journalism. She earned a Masters in Education in Secondary School Administration in 1978 from the same institution and became the first woman ever to receive the University's College of Journalism Distinguished Alumnus and was later inducted into the College of Journalism's Hall of Fame. Castro holds honorary degrees from the following institutions: St. Joseph's College – Honorary Doctor of Law (1993);  Dowling College – Honorary Doctor of Law (1996) and Daemon College – Honorary Doctor of Humane Letters (2001).

Career

Singing career 
Bernadette recorded several singles in the 1960s for Columbia Pictures' recording subsidiary Colpix Records, including a girl group–style record which hit the national charts, "His Lips Get in the Way". Bernadette's singles have been compared to top girls groups of the era like the Shangri-Las and The Ronettes. She released additional singles on Colpix including "A Girl In Love Forgives" and "Sports Car Sally," popular among many girl group collectors for its hot-rod theme.

Real estate 
While Bernadette sold the furniture division of the family's company in 1993 to Krause Furniture, she retained ownership of the real estate and remained active in the family's commercial real estate business with properties along the East Coast. Terri Keogh, Bernadette's daughter, is CEO of Castro Properties. Castro Properties' flagship property is The Castro Building, which is located in Manhattan's Flatiron District at 43 West 23rd Street. Bernard Castro, founder of Castro Convertibles, purchased the property in 1972 and all eight floors were the well-known flagship showroom for Castro Convertibles.

New York State Parks Commissioner 
In 1995, Bernadette was appointed Commissioner of the New York Office of Parks, Recreation and Historic Preservation by Governor George E. Pataki, a cabinet post she held for twelve years. During her tenure from 1995 to 2006, New York State preserved over one million acres of land through acquisition for state parks and conservation easements. Much of this was funded by a $1.75 billion environmental bond, which was authorized in 1996.

Among her many accomplishments as Commissioner, Bernadette worked with Speaker Newt Gingrich and the Trust for Public Land in 1996 to acquire the 18,000 acre Sterling Forest property for $55 million. The property protects approximately 25% of New Jersey's drinking water. Sterling Forest II, an additional 1,065 acres, was purchased later in Castro's term for $8 million. In 2001, President George W. Bush appointed Bernadette the Vice Chair of the Advisory Council on Historic Preservation.

In 2006, Castro established and strongly advocated an agreement by which Donald J Trump would construct a $40 million seaside dining and banquet hall at Jones Beach. Hailed by Castro as “like a gift from God”, this plan to install a private facility with public access at the heart of the Jones Beach boardwalk, which was controversial and widely opposed by members of the public. Trump's subsequent efforts to expand his facility proposal, coupled with increased opposition led to the project's cancellation.  This Jones Beach site has since been occupied by a new public concession facility.

At the direction of Governor George Pataki, Bernadette and her agency brought the United States Open Golf Championship to Bethpage State Park, the first time the Open was held at a public golf course. In accordance with the deal Castro struck with the U.S. Open, the Golf Championship returned to Bethpage State Park in 2009.

In 2003, the National Recreation and Park Association awarded New York State Parks, the National Gold Medal, designating them as the country's best state parks system. Also in 2003, the agency was recognized for its comprehensive efforts to save Governor's Island in New York City which was transferred from the federal government back to the people of New York.

United States Senate run

In 1994, Bernadette decided to pursue her passion for politics, running for the U.S. Senate and winning 42% of the votes against four-term Senator Daniel Patrick Moynihan.

1994 NYS Republican ticket
Governor: George Pataki
Lieutenant Governor: Elizabeth McCaughey
Comptroller: Herbert London
Attorney General: Dennis Vacco
U.S. Senate:  Bernadette Castro

Awards
Bernadette has been honored with a number of awards for her work in conservation, parks, business in including the Lifetime Achievement Award from the Advancement of Commerce, Industry and Technology (ACIT) in 2009, the Lifetime Achievement Award from Long Island Business News in 2008, the Service Award for Land and Water Conservation Fund from the National Park Service in 2006, the Governor's Parks & Preservation Award, presented by Governor George Pataki in 2005, the Women in Conservation Award from the National Audubon Society in 2005, the Theodore Roosevelt Medal for Conservation from The History Channel in 2003, the Cornelius Amory Pugsley Award, from the American Academy for Park and Recreation Administration in association with The National Park Foundation in 2002, the Theodore Roosevelt Legacy of Conservation Award in 2001, the Ellis Island Medal of Honor in 1999, as well as being inducted into the Long Island Hall of Fame in 1990. In 2017, Bernadette was honored by the Franciscan Friars of the Atonement at their annual Sharing Hope Celebration Dinner with the Graymoor Award.

Community and charity work 
Bernadette offers her support to a number of community organizations and charitable causes. Bernadette acts as fundraising auctioneer for a number organizations, as well as the Master of Ceremonies for New York Presbyterian Hospital. Bernadette also lends her support to organizations such as Tomorrow's Hope Foundation, The INN (Interfaith Nutrition Network), and the Ocala Royal Dames for Cancer Research, and the Fort Lauderdale Royal Dames of Cancer Research. The Ocala Royal Dames for Cancer Research and the Fort Lauderdale Royal Dames of Cancer Research, where both founded by Bernadette's mother, Theresa Castro. Bernadette serves on the Board of the Catholic Faith Network, is a member of the Advisory Board of Volunteers for Wildlife and a member of the Advisory Board of The New York Landmarks Conservancy. Bernadette served on the Executive Committee of the 2019 PGA Championship at the Bethpage Black Course on Long Island. She is an active member of the Columbus Citizens Foundation, an organization her father, Bernard Castro, co-founded.

Personal life
Bernadette has four children: Terri Keogh, David Austin, Jonathan Austin and Bernard Austin, as well as nine grandchildren.  Bernadette's son Jonathan Austin is also in the family real estate business. Her son David Austin is a drummer, who lives in Jupiter, Florida. Her son Bernard Austin is an architect, and lives in Wilmington, North Carolina.

References

1944 births
20th-century American politicians
20th-century American women politicians
21st-century American politicians
21st-century American women politicians
Candidates in the 1994 United States elections
Colpix Records artists
Living people
New York (state) Republicans
People from Lloyd Harbor, New York
State cabinet secretaries of New York (state)
University of Florida alumni
Women in New York (state) politics
Hispanic and Latino American women in politics